Stanislau Konrad was a Romanian football goalkeeper who took part at the 1934 FIFA World Cup.

References

External links

Romanian footballers
Romania international footballers
Liga I players
Liga II players
CSM Reșița players
Association football goalkeepers
1934 FIFA World Cup players
CA Timișoara players